Wild Romance, also known as The Wild Romance, but best known as Herman Brood & His Wild Romance was the backing band of Dutch singer-pianist Herman Brood.

While labeled as a new wave band, the director of Wild Romance's record label, Ariola, disputed this categorization when first promoting the band to the American audience in 1979, saying it came about "because he [Brood]'s a European artist".

The band was formed in 1976 in Groningen and had various lineups. The band got its name from the lyric "...and I lost my mind in a wild romance"  which they heard on the American jazz and blues singer, Mose Allison’s 1957 recording of the song Lost Mind, which was written by Percy Mayfield in 1951; both Brood and manager Koos van Dijk were fans of Allison.

The best known lineup of the band, which lasted between November 1977 and October 1979, was:

Dany Lademacher — lead guitar
Fred van Kampen ("Freddie Cavalli") — bass guitar
Cees "Ani" Meerman — drums
Monica Tjen-a-Kwoei and Anna Dekkers (Dee Dee), together known as The Bombita's - backing vocals

Following this a number of musicians, including Bertus Borgers on saxophone, joined, left and rejoined the band, however the success of the late 1970s was never repeated.

Band personnel
The major incarnations of the band were:-

Initial lineup
The first incarnation of the band was:

Ferdi Karmelk, guitarist
Gerrit Veen, bassist (left to join the Dutch band The Meteors)
Peter Walrecht, drummer
Ellen Piebes and Ria Ruiter, backing vocals

Shpritsz
In 1978, at around the time of the Shpritsz tour, the lineup was:

Dany Lademacher, guitarist
Freddie Cavalli, bass guitar 
Ani Meerman, drummer
Monica Tjen A Kwoei and Dee Dee Dekkers backing vocals

This incarnation of Herman Brood & his Wild Romance scored the hits "Saturday Night", "Still Believe" (with Bertus Borgers on saxophone), "Never Be Clever" and "I Love You Like I Love Myself". Albums Shpritsz and Cha Cha from 1978 were certified gold and platinum respectively, with the platinum disc for Cha Cha being presented to Brood by celebrity bank robber Aage Meinesz.

Meerman was replaced in October 1979 by Peter Walrecht. In 1981 Lademacher was replaced by David Hollestelle, who was in turn replaced by Erwin Java. In 1983 Renee Lopez joined the band as the new bassist.

Circa 1986
1986 saw the return of Lademacher and the lineup at this time was:

Dany Lademacher
David Hollestelle, guitar
Ruud Englebert, bassist
Cees Meerman, Roy Bakker, drums

Last incarnation
The last incarnation of the band from 1993 to 2001 consisted of:

David Hollestelle, guitarist
Ivo Severijns, bassist
Guzz Genser, drummer

Related acts
In 1982 Cees "Ani" Meerman and Fred Van Kampen formed the band "The Managers".

In 2010 former band members, Dany Lademacher and Ruud Englebert, formed a band using the name "Lost in Romance", in mid-2011 this was  simplified to just "The Romance". The lineup in 2010 was:

Dany Lademacher, guitarist
Jan Willem van Holland, guitarist
Ruud Englebert, bassist
Ronald van Beest performing as "Stick", vocals
Ramon Rambeaux, drummer

Discography

Albums
 Street (1977)
 Shpritsz (1978)
 Cha Cha (1978)
 Go Nutz (1980)
 Wait a Minute... (1980)
 Modern Times Revive (1981)
 Frisz & Sympatisz (1982)
 The Brood (1984)
 Bühnensucht/Live (1985)
 Yada Yada (1988)
 Hooks (1989)
 Freeze (1990)
 Saturday Night Live! (1992)
 Fresh Poison (1994)
 Back on the Corner (1999)
 Ciao Monkey (2000)
 The Final (2006)
 Kidstuff (2006)

DVDs

References

External links
Herman Brood & His Wild Romance Line-ups
 
 

Herman Brood
Dutch new wave musical groups
Dutch blues rock musical groups
Musical groups established in 1976
Musical groups disestablished in 2001
1976 establishments in the Netherlands
2001 disestablishments in the Netherlands